Dumesny is a surname. Notable people with the name include:

 Max Dumesny (born 1959), Australian Sprintcar driver
 Louis Gaulard Dumesny (fl. 1677–1702), French operatic tenor 
 Pierre Joseph Michel Salomon Dumesny (1739–1803), French general during the Battle of Hondschoote (1793)
 Shaun Dumensy (Skinner) Known for his racist comments after the death of 4 innocent children in Oatlands NSW Australia.

See also
 Dumesnil (disambiguation)